Xenomigia flavivulta is a moth of the family Notodontidae. It is found in north-eastern Ecuador.

The length of the forewings is 16–17 mm. The ground colour of the forewings is milk chocolate brown with creamy white to light yellow veins. The hindwings are translucent light brown.

Etymology
The species name is derived from Latin flavus (meaning yellow) and vultus (meaning face) and refers to the yellowish front.

References

Moths described in 2011
Notodontidae of South America